Goi, Rode, Goi! is the fifth full-length album by the Russian pagan metal band Arkona. It was released on 28 October 2009 through Napalm Records.  "Goy, Rode, Goy!" means "Hail, Rod, Hail!". Rod is the Slavic Great God, Father of
the Universe.

The album has a large cast of guest vocalists and musicians, most notably on the track "Na Moyey Zemle" which features vocalists from Månegarm of Sweden, Obtest of Lithuania, Menhir of Germany, Skyforger of Latvia, and Heidevolk of the Netherlands. Each sings in their native language, playing the role of warriors from that region describing their homeland to a traveler.

The album is one of the band's few releases on limited edition double-LP, released in a hand-numbered edition of 500. The album is packaged in a gatefold with plain white inner sleeves and pressed in Germany. The album reverses the order of two songs "Pritcha" and "Na Moey Zemle" in comparison to the CD version, leaving four songs to each side of a record except for side B which has only the two.

Reception

The album received positive international reviews. About.com marked a combination of powerful vocals with deep and dynamic compositions but observed a mostly light-hearted atmosphere reminiscent of Finnish humppa metal acts like Finntroll and Korpiklaani. The reviewer rated Arkona as one of the best pagan bands.

The German Sonic Seducer wrote that this album was more epic and more orchestral but also more playful than previous releases. Metal Hammer Germany lauded singer Arkhipova's vocal range and the consequent traditionally Russian melody lines.

The album was favourably reviewed by Kerrang! which emphasized that, unlike many in this subgenre, Arkona "are genuine pagans and formed this band in an effort to mirror their philosophies." "The title-track and "Nevidal" provide galloping warrior metal, while the bouncy "Yarilo" is Jolly Roger flying Turisas-style fun that sadly clock in at less than three minutes. It's sung entirely in Russian, and is, bizarrely, all the better for it," reviewer Steve Beebee argued, giving it a 3 out of 5K's rating.

Track listing
All lyrics written by Maria Arkhipova, except on the song "Na moey zemle", written by Arkona and the members of groups Månegarm, Obtest, Menhir, Skyforger and Heidevolk. All music written by Maria Arkhipova, except on the song "Korochun", written by Vladimir "Volk".

Personnel

Arkona
Masha "Scream": clean, screaming and death vocals, choir, keyboards, percussion
Sergei Lazar: electric & acoustic guitars, balalaika
Ruslan "Kniaz": bass
Vlad "Artist": drums, percussion

Additional musicians
Aleksandr: accordion
Vladimir Cherepovskiy: bagpipes, tin whistle, low whistle, recorder, ocarina & flute
Cosmin "Hultanu" Duduc: alphorn (track 1)
Kaspars Bārbals: bagpipes
Jan Liljekvist: flute, violin (track 4)
Vasily Derevyanniy: domra
Vladimir "Volk": bagpipes, recorder
Dmitriy "Vetrodar" mandolin
Baalberith, Edgars "Zirgs" Grabovskis, Erik Grawsiö, Heiko Gerull, Joris "Boghtdrincker", Mark "Splintervuyscht", Peter, Sadlave: vocals (track 4)
Alexsandr "Shmel", Ilya "Wolfenhirt" choir

Production
Produced by Masha "Scream" & Sergei "Lazar"
Recorded, engineered, mixed & mastered by Sergei "Lazar"

External links

References

2009 albums
Arkona (band) albums
Napalm Records albums